is a passenger railway station in the city of Hitachinaka, Ibaraki, Japan operated by East Japan Railway Company (JR East).

Lines 
Hitachi-Aoyagi Station is served by the Suigun Line, and is located 1.9 rail kilometers from the official starting point of the line at Mito Station.

Station layout 
The station consists of a single island platform with a level crossing. There is no station building and the station is unattended.

History 
The Ota Railway merged with the Mito Railway on October 21, 1901 and was nationalized on December 1, 1927. The station was renamed to its present name on that date. The station was absorbed into the JR East network upon the privatization of the Japanese National Railways (JNR) on April 1, 1987.

Surrounding area 

Mito Citizen's Athletic Stadium

See also
List of railway stations in Japan

External links 

  JR East Station information 

Railway stations in Ibaraki Prefecture
Suigun Line
Railway stations in Japan opened in 1897
Hitachinaka, Ibaraki